There are over 2,500 streets on the territory of the administrative City of Belgrade. Not all of them are located within the borders of the Belgrade city itself, and this list will deal only with those situated in the city.

Introduction 

Some streets were already unofficially named during the Ottoman period, before 1806. They were named after the mosques (Tefderdarska, Bajrak), well-known Ottomans who lived in them (Jaja-Pašina, Eski-Agina, Deli-Ahmetova) or the local artisans (Bitpazarska, Spahijska, Čauška, Delijska). Name of the Delijska Street survived until today. During the 18th century occupation by the Austrians, they renamed some of the streets (Bitpazarska to Dunavska) and named others (Eugena Savojskog [modern Braće Baruh], Carigradska [modern Vasina], Apotekarska, Kamenička, Klosterska, Tri Hana).

After the liberation from the Ottomans in 1806, the streets weren't named, instead the houses were numbered regarding to which quarter they belong. On 15 March 1847 city administration asked from the Ministry of the Interior to do the numbering of the houses. The ministry decided to divide the entire city into six quarters and to name streets "within the [Laduon's] trench", which divided Belgrade in two. The ministry named 30 streets on 9 February 1848, while 40 alleys remained unnamed as the ministry deemed they don't need names. None of the streets are named today the way they were in 1848, though some names survived but were later given to other streets.

1848 street names

After the dynastic change in 1858, streets were to be renamed. Prince Mihajlo Obrenović formed the commission in 1864. This was also the first municipal, Belgrade commission which named the streets. The commission worked for years. Prince was assassinated in 1868, and the commission's first decision was to name the Knez Mihailova Street after him. The work was finished in March 1872, when 60 streets were named. Of those, 29 never changed their names. Record is held by the Svetogorska Street which changed its name 7 times, while Dečanska Street changed it 6 times. Only 6%, or 150, are named after women. New Communist authorities after 1945 changed names of 160 streets in the Belgrade's central area. After democratic change in 2000, 267 names from the Communist period were changed or restored to the original, pre-war names. In total, over 500 streets got new or changed names in 2004–08 period.

From 30 named streets in 1848, number grew to 60 in 1872, 176 in 1882 and 213 in 1895. First permanent commission for naming of the streets was founded in 1888 as Odbor za naimenovanje ulica. They initially decided to change previous names as little as possible and the name them after the most deserving individuals, Serbian rivers, areas as mountains. Also, they decided to name streets close to the Belgrade Fortress after the rebels from the First Serbian Uprising, who participated in the liberation of Belgrade in 1806.

Characteristics 

The streets which never changed their names are:

With only , the Lovačka Street in the outer neighborhood of Žarkovo is officially the shortest street. They have no numbers as all the buildings located in them are numbered from the neighboring streets.

As of 2017, the busiest street in Belgrade is Bulevar vojvode Mišića: 8,000 vehicles per hour in one direction during the morning rush hour.

List

Major streets

Major squares

Legend

List of streets 

Alphabetical list of streets in Belgrade:

A

C

Č

Ć

DŽ

Đ

E

F

H

I

L

LJ

N

NJ

Š

Z

Ž

List of squares and plateaus

References

Notes 

Notes:

External links

Streets and squares
Streets and squares

Streets
Belgrade
Belgrade
Streets and squares